Streptomyces asenjonii is a bacterium species from the genus Streptomyces which has been isolated from hyper-arid soil from the Atacama Desert.

See also 
 List of Streptomyces species

References 

asenjonii
Bacteria described in 2017